Jaydon Hibbert (born 17 January 2005) is a Jamaican track and field athlete. He won the gold medal in the triple jump at the 2022 World Under-20 Championships and a silver in the previous edition.

Hibbert holds the world U20 and Jamaican senior record in the indoor triple jump, set at the 2023 NCAA Indoors where he won the title.

Personal life
Jaydon Hibbert attended Kingston College High School in Kingston, Jamaica. Upon graduation he is set to attend University of Arkansas for the 2022-23 year where he will join compatriots Wayne Pinnock, and Carey McLeod, amongst others.

Career
In June, 2022 Hibbert won the senior triple jump title at the Jamaican National Championships in Kingston. Previous to this in the spring of 2022, Hibbert had won both the long jump and the triple jump at the 2022 CARIFTA Games.

Hibbert broke the championship record with his first jump at the 2022 IAAF World Junior Championships in Cali, Colombia. Measured at 17.27m was a personal best by 61 cm, and placed him second on the all time under-18 list. It was enough for Hibbert to go one better than the silver medal he won at the 2021 world under-20 championships held in Nairobi. In fact, Hibbert’s second jump of 16.82m would also have been enough to win the 2022 competition.

Achievements
All information from World Athletics profile.

Personal bests
 Long jump –  (Kingston 2022)
 Triple jump –  (Cali 2022) 
 Triple jump indoor –  (Albuquerque 2023)

NCAA titles
 NCAA Division I Men's Indoor Track and Field Championships
 Triple jump: 2023

References

External links
 

2005 births
Living people
Jamaican male triple jumpers
Sportspeople from Kingston, Jamaica
21st-century Jamaican people
World Athletics U20 Championships winners